The tiny serotine (Neoromicia guineensis) is a species of vesper bat. It is found in Benin, Burkina Faso, Cameroon, Central African Republic, Chad, Republic of the Congo, Democratic Republic of the Congo, Ivory Coast, Ethiopia, Gambia, Ghana, Guinea, Guinea-Bissau, Nigeria, Senegal, Sudan, Togo, and Uganda. Its natural habitats are savanna and subtropical or tropical shrubland.

References

Neoromicia
Taxonomy articles created by Polbot
Mammals described in 1889
Taxa named by José Vicente Barbosa du Bocage
Bats of Africa